(or ), also known as  and , is a traditional event in which a bull (Bos indicus), such as the Pulikulam or Kangayam breeds, is released into a crowd of people, and multiple human participants attempt to grab the large hump on the bull's back with both arms and hang on to it while the bull attempts to escape. Participants hold the hump for as long as possible, attempting to bring the bull to a stop. In some cases, participants must ride long enough to remove flags on the bull's horns.

 is typically practised in the Indian state of Tamil Nadu as a part of Pongal celebrations on Mattu Pongal day, which occurs annually in January.

As there were incidents of injury and death associated with the sport, both to the participants and to the animals forced into it, animal rights organizations have called for a ban on the sport, resulting in the Supreme Court of India banning it several times over the past years. However, with protests from the people against the ban, a new ordinance was made in 2017 to continue the sport.

Etymology 

History 

 has been known to be practiced during the Tamil classical period (400–100 BCE). It was common among the Ayar tribes
people who lived in the ‘Mullai’ geographical region of the ancient Tamizh Nadu. Later, it became a platform for display of bravery, and prize money was introduced for participation encouragement. A seal from the Indus Valley civilization depicting the practice is preserved in the National Museum, New Delhi. A cave painting in white kaolin discovered near Madurai depicting a lone man trying to control a bull is estimated to be about 1,500 years old.

Jallikattu venues 
Well-known jallikattu venues include the following:

Variants and rules 

Some variants include:
The bull is released from a closed space and the contestants attempt to wrap their arms or hands around the hump of the bull and hold on to it to win the award. Only one person is allowed to attempt at a time. This variant is most common in the districts of Madurai, Theni, Thanjavur, and Salem.
: In this variant the approach is slightly different as the bull is directly released into open ground. The rules are the same as that of vadi majuviraṭṭu.  This is a popular variant in the districts of Sivagangai and Madurai.
: In this variant, the bull is tied with a  rope ( means 'circle' in Tamil). There are no other physical restrictions for the bull and hence it can move freely anywhere. The maximum time period given is 30 minutes. A team of seven to nine members can attempt to untie the gift token that is tied on the bull's horn.

Typically, participants must only hold onto the bull's hump. In some variations, they are disqualified if they hold onto the bull's neck, horns or tail. There may be several goals to the game depending on the region. If the contestant is thrown by the bull or falls, they lose. Some variations only allow for one contestant. If two people grab the hump, then neither person wins.

Breeding 
Bos indicus bulls are bred specifically by people of the village for the event. Bulls that are able to participate successfully in the  event are used as studs for breeding. These bulls also fetch higher prices in the markets.

Training and preparation

Training 
Kabaddi was played as a warm up sport before the players enter the arena for Jallikattu.

Preparation 
With the introduction of the Regulation of Jallikattu Act, 2009, by the Tamil Nadu legislature, the following activities were done in preparation of the event:
 A written permission is obtained from the respective collector, thirty days prior to conduct of event along with notification of the event location.
 The arena and the way through which the bulls pass through is double-barricaded, in order to avoid injuries to the spectators and by-standers who may be permitted to remain within the barricades.
 The necessary gallery areas are built up along the double barricades.
 The necessary permissions are obtained from the collector for the participants and the bulls fifteen days prior.
 Final preparation before the event include a complete testing by the authorities of the Animal Husbandry Department, to ensure that performance enhancement drugs, liquor or other irritants are not used on the bulls.

Animal rights concerns

Between 2008 and 2014, 43 humans and 4 bulls were killed in the  events. In 2017, there were 23 deaths in addition to about 2,500 human injuries and several instances of injury to the bulls. Year 2020 saw 5 deaths from participation in the event.

Animal welfare concerns are related to the handling of the bulls before they are released and also during competitor's attempts to subdue the bull. Practices before the bull is released include prodding the bull with sharp sticks or scythes, extreme bending of the tail which can fracture the vertebrae, and biting of the bull's tail. There are also reports of the bulls being forced to drink alcohol to disorient them, or chilli peppers being rubbed in their eyes to aggravate the bull.

During attempts to subdue the bull, they are stabbed by various implements such as knives or sticks, punched, jumped on and dragged to the ground. In variants in which the bull is not enclosed, they may run into traffic or other dangerous places, sometimes resulting in broken bones or death. Protestors claim that  is promoted as bull taming, however, others suggest it exploits the bull's natural nervousness as prey animals by deliberately placing them in a terrifying situation in which they are forced to run away from the competitors which they perceive as predators and the practice effectively involves catching a terrified animal. Along with human injuries and fatalities, bulls themselves sometimes sustain injuries or die, which people may interpret as a bad omen for the village.

In his work Animal Rights Without Liberation, which analyses the use of animals in cultural practices and concerns about hypocrisy, political theorist Alasdair Cochrane argues that culture cannot outweigh animal rights or outweigh animal interests in not being killed, even if this entails the destruction of cultures "defined entirely by the grave harm [they cause] to animals" and cites  as an example to argue that culture or human interests cannot outweigh animal interests in not suffering. An investigation by the Animal Welfare Board of India concluded that " is inherently cruel to animals".

Animal welfare organisations such as the Federation of Indian Animal Protection Organisations (FIAPO) and PETA India have protested against the practice. The Indian Minister of Women and Child Development Maneka Gandhi denied the claim by  aficionados that the sport is only to demonstrate the "Tamil love for the bull", citing that the Tirukkural does not sanction cruelty to animals.

Ban, protests and authorization

The Animal Welfare Board of India filed a case in the Supreme Court of India for an outright ban on  because of the cruelty to animals and the threat to public safety involved.

The Government of Tamil Nadu ordered that  be deposited by the organizers in case of an accident or injury during the event and enacted a rule to allow a team of veterinarians be present at the venue for certifying the bulls for participation in the event and to provide treatment for bulls that get injured.

The Ministry of Environment and Forests issued a notification in 2011 that banned the use of bulls as performing animals, thereby banning the event But the practice continued to be held under Tamil Nadu Regulation of Jallikattu Act No 27 of 2009. On 7 May 2014, the Supreme Court of India struck down the State law and banned  altogether. The Supreme Court noted that any flouting of the ban should result in penalties for cruelty to animals under The Prevention of Cruelty to Animals Act, 1960. The court also asked the Government of India to amend the law on preventing cruelty to animals to bring bulls within its ambit. The Supreme Court also ruled that cruelty is inherent in these events, as bulls are not anatomically suited for such activities and making them participate is subjecting them to unnecessary pain and suffering, so such events were outlawed.

On 8 January 2016, the Ministry of Environment and Forests permitted the continuation of the tradition under certain conditions, effectively ending the ban. However, on 14 January 2016, the Supreme Court of India issued a stay on this order, upholding the ban, after a petition filed by the Animal Welfare Board of India and PETA India, leading to protests all over Tamil Nadu. The Supreme Court refused to review its decision on 26 July 2016.

On 16 January 2016, the World Youth Organization (WYO) protested at Chennai against the stay on the order overturning ban on conducting  in Tamil Nadu. The WYO also demanded a ban on PETA in India.

The participants walked from the lighthouse to the labour statue bearing posters saying "save ". A few churches openly conducted prayer mass and rally against the Supreme Court ruling. Following the protests at Chennai, many students started rallies in various towns of Tamil Nadu.

After hearing the petitions which were led by the Animal Welfare Board of India challenging central government's notification, the Supreme Court of India on 12 January ordered a stay, issued notices to the central government and the Tamil Nadu government and later refused to lift the stay. Numerous  events were held across Tamil Nadu in protest of the ban, and hundreds of participants were detained by police in response.

Due to these protests, on 21 January 2017, the governor of Tamil Nadu issued a new ordinance that authorized the continuation of  events. On 23 January 2017 the Tamil Nadu legislature passed a bipartisan bill, with the accession of the Prime Minister, exempting  from the Prevention of Cruelty to Animals Act (1960). The first legal  under this exemption took place on 1 February in Alanganallur, Madurai district.

The legal situation surrounding  is as yet not clearly resolved. Some, such as ex Ministry of External Affairs cabinet minister Salman Khurshid, have stated that the matter will only be truly resolved if the Prevention of Cruelty to Animals Act is amended as local ordinances and state laws cannot trump Indian federal law. According to The Hindu, many other Indian legal experts agreed with Khurshid's view, as federal laws such as the PCA are always more powerful than state laws, and in that respect the Prevention of Cruelty to Animals (Tamil Nadu Amendment) Act of 2017 is not much different from the state law overturned in 2009. For its part, PETA India has said that it will "study" the new ordinance, and has not ruled out a challenge to the new law on the same grounds as it challenged the 2009 law. On Jan 25, the Animal Welfare Board of India (AWBI) started the legal process towards another ban by formally challenging the new law before the Supreme Court, but they withdrew the petition on Jan 26. According to the AWBI's acting chairperson, AWBI does not plan to re-file the petition, but he claimed no knowledge of what other organizations, such as PETA, may do.

Timeline of the legal battle against the performance 

 10 January 2007:  organisers file an appeal and the Single Bench Order is stayed by a Division Bench, paving the way to conduct the event again.
 9 March 2007: The Division Bench sets aside Single Bench Order and gives suggestions to the State to introduce a regulatory mechanism.
 27 July 2007: The Madras High Court's order is stayed by the Supreme Court after hearing an appeal by AWBI.
 11 January 2008: The Supreme Court vacates stay, refusing to allow the sport.
 15 January 2008: The Supreme Court allows a revision petition of the State, thereby permitting the event.
 21 July 2009: The ruling DMK government passes the Tamil Nadu Regulation of Jallikattu Act, 2009.
 8 April 2011: The Tamil Nadu Regulation of Jallikattu Act, 2009 is challenged by PETA before the Supreme Court.
 11 July 2011: Ministry of Environment and Forests issues notification banning the use of bulls as performing animals.
 7 May 2014: The Supreme Court bans  and strikes down the State law on the basis of a plea by the AWBI and PETA.
 7 January 2016: Ministry of Environment and Forests modifies its earlier notification to permit the sport.
 12 January 2016: The Supreme Court stays the centre's notification after hearing pleas by the AWBI and PETA.
 16 November 2016: The State government's review petition seeking permission to conduct the event in 2017 is dismissed by the Supreme Court.
 12 January 2017: The Supreme Court refuses to give a hurried judgement on a government notification to accommodate the sport in 2017.
 21 January 2017: The Centre clears the ordinance proposed by the AIADMK government to bring a State amendment to the Prevention of Cruelty to Animals Act, 1960. The State had earlier urged the centre to consider the plea following massive protests.
 24 January 2017: The AWBI and PETA challenges the Tamil Nadu Amendment Act, 2017.
 31 January 2017: The Supreme Court refuses to stay the Tamil Nadu Amendment Act, 2017.
 6 November 2017: The Supreme Court seeks the State government's response to the plea filed by PETA questioning the Amendment Act.
 2 February 2018: The Supreme Court refers all petitions filed against the sport to a Constitution Bench.

Jallikattu Premier League
The league was announced on 24 February 2018, to be organized in Chennai by the Tamil Nadu Jallikattu Peravai and the Chennai Jallikattu Amaippu.

In popular culture 
 is often shown in Tamil cinema where the hero tames the bull to prove his gallantry. Some of the popular movies include:
 Aravaan
 Cheran Pandiyan
 Ilami
 Kanni Paruvathile
 Mann Vasanai
 Mirugam - The movie was released after cutting the  scene due to objections by the Censor Board
 Murattu Kaalai
 Rajakumaran
 Thaikku pin Tharam
 Vilaiyaattu Pillai
 Virumaandi

Popular cinema, an integral part of the modern social and political life of Tamil Nadu, has often portrayed  as a symbol of masculinity and social status. There are instances of the portrayal running as a counter-narrative, wherein a young hero tames an overlord's bull and turns it into a challenge to power and authority.
In films such as Cheran Pandian, Rajakumaran, and Murattukaalai, the conflict between the hero and the villain is portrayed through , during which the owner whose bull loses shoots the bull.
In Mannvasanai, the heroine's father declares that whoever tames the bull is eligible to marry his daughter, but kills the animal and commits suicide after an outsider from a nearby village tames it and lays claim to his daughter as the prize. 
In Virumaandi the hero who returns from Singapore tames the bull, which means that his masculinity and traditional roots are intact, despite going to a foreign land.
In Thaiku pin Tharam,  is built into the film's climax, and it helps the hero prove he is worthy enough to win the girl.

See also 

 2017 pro-jallikattu protests
 kabaddi
 Bull-leaping

References

External links 
Video from 2013 Animal Welfare Board investigation into animal cruelty at Jallikattu events
Video of a Jallikattu event
Jallikattu Premier League
Continuation of the sport of Jallikattu

Bullfighting
Cruelty to animals
Sport in Tamil Nadu
Tamil sports and games
Traditional sports of India
Culture of Madurai
Animal welfare
Animal rights
Culture of Tamil Nadu
Tamil culture
Jallikattu